Miguel Bover Pons (14 February 1928, in Palma de Mallorca – 25 January 1966, in Palma de Mallorca) was a Spanish professional road bicycle racer. Miguel Bover Pons was the son of 1920 Spanish road race champion Miguel Bover Salom.

Major results

1949
Trofeo Masferrer
1956
GP Pascuas
Trofeo Jaumendreu
Vuelta a Andalucía
Tour de France:
Winner stage 20
1957
GP Martorell
1962
Six days of Madrid (with Miguel Poblet)

External links 

Official Tour de France results for Miguel Bover

Spanish male cyclists
1928 births
1966 deaths
Spanish Tour de France stage winners
Sportspeople from Palma de Mallorca
Cyclists from the Balearic Islands
20th-century Spanish people